The 2010 Kazan Kremlin Cup was a professional tennis tournament played on indoor hard courts. It was part of the 2010 ATP Challenger Tour. It took place in Kazan, Russia, between 1 and 7 February 2010.

ATP entrants

Seeds

 Rankings are as of January 18, 2010

Other entrants
The following players received wildcards into the singles main draw:
  Marat Gilmanov
  Vladislav Gorshenin
  Anton Manegin
  Daniyal Zagidullin

The following players received entry from the qualifying draw:
  Evgeny Donskoy
  Mikhail Ledovskikh
  Aleksandr Lobkov
  Denis Matsukevich

Champions

Singles

 Michał Przysiężny def.  Julian Reister, 7–6(5), 6–4

Doubles

 Jan Mertl /  Yuri Schukin def.  Tobias Kamke /  Julian Reister, 6–2, 6–4.

External links

2010 ATP Challenger Tour
2010 in Russian tennis
2010
2010
February 2010 sports events in Russia